Tressa may refer to:

 Tressa (river), a torrent in Tuscany, central Italy
 Tressa, a feminine given name
 Ponte a Tressa, a village in Tuscany, central Italy, administratively a frazione of the comune of Monteroni d'Arbia, province of Siena